The 1895–96 season of Scottish football was the 23rd season of competitive football in Scotland and the sixth season of the Scottish Football League.  This season also saw the introduction of the Scottish Qualifying Cup.

League competitions

Scottish Division One 

Celtic topped the Scottish Division One.

Scottish Division Two 

Abercorn came first in the Scottish Division Two. Leith Athletic and Renton finished second and third

Other honours

Cup honours

National

County

Non-league honours

Senior 
Highland League

Other Leagues

Scotland national team

Scotland were winners of the 1896 British Home Championship.

Key:
(H) = Home match
(A) = Away match
BHC = British Home Championship

Other national teams

Scottish League XI

See also
1895–96 Rangers F.C. season

Notes

References

 
Seasons in Scottish football